Paraesylacris bituberosa (Etymology: Latin: with two tubers),  is a species of beetle in the family Cerambycidae. It was described by Breuning in 1940.

References

Apomecynini
Beetles described in 1940